Hamonic was a passenger vessel designed for service on the Great Lakes. She was launched in 1909, and served until she burned, in a catastrophic fire, at Sarnia, Ontario, on July 17, 1945.  However, unlike the catastrophic fire that struck her sister ship, in 1949, where 119 passengers died, all of Hamonics passengers and crew survived.

Elmer Kleinsmith, a crane operator, operating a crane designed to load and unload coal, was near enough to use his crane's bucket, to rescue the ship's complement. Some sources say there were no fatalities, others say there was a single fatality.

References

1909 ships
Steamships of Canada
Great Lakes ships
Canada Steamship Lines
Ship fires
Ships built in Collingwood, Ontario